Royal Southern Brotherhood is the debut studio album by American blues and blues rock supergroup Royal Southern Brotherhood, released May 8, 2012. In support of the album, the band began an international tour on May 11, 2012, with shows in USA and Canada, as well as multiple countries in Europe.

The band members consist of: 
Cyril Neville, a Grammy Award winning singer and percussionist, former member of bands The Meters, the Neville Brothers and Galactic; Devon Allman, vocalist and guitarist from his band Honeytribe, who was featured on a top 10 hit in Europe with guitar master Javier Vargas; Mike Zito, vocalist and guitarist of his own band, which was nominated in 2009 and 2011 for the Blues Foundation’s 'Rock Blues Album of the Year' award; Yonrico Scott, drummer from Derek Trucks Band; and Charlie Wooton, bass guitar.

In 2009 Zito and Neville won the Blues Music Award 'Song of the Year' for "Pearl River", the title track to Zito’s 2009 release.

Recording 
In December 2011, the band recorded the album during the course of five days at Dockside Studio, a 12-acre estate on the banks of Vermilion Bayou, in Maurice, Louisiana.

Reception

Andy Snipper of Music News.com noted that "the album has music from all over the South, i.e. New Orleans funk, Atlanta hot Blues, and Memphis soul," and that "Cyril Neville is a great vocalist and his easy style and even tones set the stage for Allman’s incendiary guitar as well as Mike Zito’s more classic Blues style." Among the variety of songs, Snipper comments that "'Fired Up" is "a dark piece of Soul with a stunning solo from Allman", "Moonlight Over The Mississippi" has "a more New Orleans feel to it", and "Sweet Jelly Donut" is "a sassy piece of raunchy Blues with some fine slide and a seriously funky rhythm".

Chart
The album debuted at No. 5 on the Billboard Blues Albums chart and No. 30 on the Billboard Heatseekers Albums chart.

Track listing

Personnel
Royal Southern Brotherhood
Cyril Neville - vocals, percussion
Devon Allman - vocals, guitar
Mike Zito - vocals, guitar
Charlie Wooton - bass guitar
Yonrico Scott - drums

Production
Jim Gaines - producer
Ruben M. Williams - associate producer
David Farrell - engineer
Brad Blackwood - mastering
Thomas Ruf - executive producer

References

External links 
 Royal Southern Brotherhood

2012 debut albums